Solitary Peak is a peak (2,810 m) located 4.5 nautical miles (8 km) southeast of Mount Rabot in Queen Elizabeth Range. An important geologic section was measured on the feature by the Ohio State University Geological Party, 1967–68, which suggested the name because of the peak's relative isolation.

Mountains of the Ross Dependency
Shackleton Coast